Artur Menezes  (born July 14, 1997) is a Brazilian blues and blues rock guitarist, singer and songwriter. He has released five albums since 2010, with the most recent, Fading Away (2020), being released by Vizztone Records. That same year, Menezes got his Green Card granted by the US government, specifically because of his contribution to the blues.

Life and career
He was born in Brazil and was interested in music as a young child.  His first interest was rock, spurred on by his elder brother. His outlook changed when he was around 13 years old and able to play the electric guitar.  He experienced a different sounding track on the radio and discovered he had heard blues for the first time.  The moment was life changing. Menezes spent a lot of time alone growing up as his parents had separated, and his mother worked long hours as a university teacher and then part time singer in the evenings.

As his guitar playing flourished, he remained a blues devotee but utilised other styles such as psychedelic rock, funk, and baião, a rhythm local to his own north east region  of Brazil. Due to family circumstances, Menezes lived briefly in Chicago, Illinois, United States, in 2006, 2007, and 2011. While there he had the opportunity to participate in jam sessions involving John Primer, Linsey Alexander, Phil Guy, and Jimmy Burns, among others.  These took place in Chicago bars and clubs including Kingston Mines, Smokey Daddy, Rosa's, Vine Tastings and Katherina's. Menezes commented "I guess the best moment of my career was when I played the open act of Buddy Guy's South America Tour in 2012. I had the great chance to play with him in a jam session on his club Buddy Guy's Legends, in 2011". In the interim, back home in Brazil, Menezes climbed to the summit of their blues music scene, headlining festivals. By 2010, Menezes had recorded his debut album, Early To Marry, which was released by Tratore Brasil.
In 2013, Menezes undertook a tour of Argentina, and released his sophomore album, 2. In an effort to disseminate and expand access to blues across Brazil, Menezes was already a founder of 'Casa do Blues' ('House Of Blues'), although he left the board in early 2013. The same year, Menezes spoke at TEDx, an annual event licensed by TED, where speakers share experience and knowledge via a live online broadcast.

In 2014, Menezes was the headliner at the Augustibluus Festival in Haapsalu, Estonia, and he also performed at various club dates across the UK. In 2015, he undertook a tour in Mexico. The same year, Menezes issued his third studio album via Tratore Brasil, Drive Me.  In 2016, Menezes relocated to reside in Los Angeles, California. In 2017, Menezes shared the stage with Joe Satriani, at another festival in Brazil before a 20,000 strong audience. The following year Menezes and his backing ensemble entered the International Blues Challenge in Memphis, Tennessee. He was the winner of the "Albert King Award" for Best Guitarist, and they took third place in the Best Band Category. His fourth album, Keep Pushing (2018), was produced by Josh Smith, who also played rhythm guitar on the recording. The album contained ten tracks all composed by Menezes. In the US, Menezes opened for Bobby Rush in Los Angeles.

In 2019, Menezes was selected by Eric Clapton to perform at the Crossroads Guitar Festival, held at Madison Square Garden, New York. Menezes's most recent album, Fading Away, was released in October 2020 through Vizztone Records, and featured one song with Joe Bonamassa. It was produced by Josh Smith. In 2020, Menezes got his Green Card granted by the US government because of his contribution to blues. He also teaches guitar at the Musicians Institute in Hollywood, Los Angeles, and has online courses and masterclasses. In 2020 and 2021, Menezes had major tours to Europe and South America.  He is reported to be working on a new album prior to signing a recording contract with a major record label.

Discography

Albums

References

External links
Official website

1997 births
Living people
21st-century Brazilian male singers
21st-century Brazilian singers
21st-century guitarists
Brazilian male guitarists
Brazilian male singer-songwriters
Brazilian expatriates in the United States
Brazilian music educators